Statue of Subhas Chandra Bose is a 28 feet tall black granite statue of Indian freedom fighter Netaji Subhas Chandra Bose. It is placed under the canopy behind India Gate in Delhi. Mysuru-based sculptor Arun Yogiraj is the sculptor.

Design and construction

Design
Indian Prime Minister Narendra Modi announced the construction of Statue of Subhas Chandra Bose in 2021. He said that the statue would be installed in the canopy of India Gate to mark 'Azadi Ka Amrit Mohotsav', commemorating 75 years of independence as well as Bose's 125th birth anniversary.

Construction
A large black granite stone was selected for the statue and brought from Telangana to Delhi. The statue was designed by a team under the Ministry of Culture led by Sculptor Arun Yogiraj.

Inauguration
On 8 September 2022, Prime Minister Narendra Modi inaugurated the statue of Netaji Subhas Chandra Bose near India Gate in New Delhi.

See also 
 Subhas Chandra Bose statue (Shyambazar, Kolkata)

References

Memorials to Subhas Chandra Bose
Statues in India
2022 sculptures